The Alai mole vole (Ellobius alaicus) is a species of rodent in the family Cricetidae. It is known only from Kyrgyzstan, where it has been found in temperate grassland in the Alai Mountains. Little else is known about the vole.

It is threatened by habitat loss.

References

Ellobius
Mammals of Central Asia
Endemic fauna of Kyrgyzstan
Rodents of Asia
Mammals described in 1969
Taxonomy articles created by Polbot